Charles Parker (1877-1934) was a member of the Michigan House of Representatives.  He was one of six members of the state House killed in the Kerns Hotel fire in Lansing on December 11, 1934.  Also killed were representatives D. Knox Hanna, T. Henry Howlett, Vern Voorhees, John W. Goodwine, and Don E. Sias, along with state senator John Leidlein.  The men were in Lansing for a special session of the Michigan legislature.

Born in 1877. Democrat. Member of Michigan state house of representatives from Genesee County 2nd District, 1933–34; died in office 1934. Died December 11, 1934 (age about 57 years). Interment at Smith Hill Cemetery, Otisville, Mich.

References

Members of the Michigan House of Representatives
Accidental deaths in Michigan
1934 deaths
Deaths from fire in the United States
1877 births